Dmitry Vladimirovich Dmitriyenko (born August 17, 1963) is the former Governor of Murmansk. He worked in the army during the 1980s and in various Murmanskian government agencies, including water management, prior to his appointment to the governorship in March 2009.

In 2012 he resigned from the Murmansk Oblast Governorship.

Education
In 1985, Dmitriyenko graduated from navy academy (school) and was specialized as an engineer in electro-mechanics (ship equipment); later on – in 1999 he graduated from North-West academy of state services and was specialized there as a manager in the sphere of state and municipal sphere).

Political career
From 1980 to 1992, Dmitriyenko served in the army at Pacific and North Fleets.

From 1992 to 2004, Dmitriyenko worked as a manager at several private companies. 1999–2002, he was a counselor to the Governor of Krasnoyarsk region on energy and transport issues. This included a brief stint from 2002 to 2004 as a counselor to the deputy Transport Minister.

From 2004 to 2006, he was promoted to the position of assistant to the head of the Federal Agency of  Transport. In March 2006, he was again promoted to deputy head of the Agency in the area of economy and finances.

In 2008, President Vladimir Putin appointed Dmitrienko to the position of deputy head of the Federal Fisheries Agency.

Governor of Murmansk
On March 21, 2009, President Dmitry Medvedev nominated Dmitriyenko acting Governor of Murmansk Oblast. Medvedev chose not to use his power to personally appoint new Governors. The Murmansk regional Duma approved Dmitriyenko for the position, and appointed him Governor on March 24.

According to Russian journalists, Dmitriyenko wants to use new laws restricting local government elections to remove a number of regional officials from office.

On April 4, 2012 he resigned from office, and was replaced by Marina Kovtun.

References

|-

1963 births
Living people
Governors of Murmansk Oblast
People from Murmansk
United Russia politicians
21st-century Russian politicians
Northwestern Management Institute alumni